Exuma is the self-titled debut studio album by Bahamian folk musician Exuma. It was originally released in May 1970 on the Mercury label.

Background
In the early 1960s, Exuma (born Macfarlane Gregory Anthony Mackey) had moved to Greenwich Village, New York and started playing guitar and singing in the cultivating folk rock scene developing in that area. After producer Bob Wyld came up to him offering a record deal, he chose to adopt "Exuma, the Obeah Man" as his name. The pseudonym draws from memories of Junkanoo festivals from his childhood.

Production
Wyld adopted the pseudonym "Daddy Ya Ya" and recruited a few musicians for the album, including Peppy Castro of the Blues Magoos (who was credited under the pseudonym "Spy Boy Thielheim"). During recording sessions, Exuma would often turn off the lights and set up candles, recalling songs from his dreams. The album cover was painted by Exuma himself.

Release and reception

The album received positive reviews and moderate airplay at the time of its release. The opening track on the album, "Exuma, the Obeah Man", was released as a single.

In a retrospective review, Richie Unterberger of AllMusic wrote, "Exuma's debut album was a real odd piece of work...it's kind of like a combination of the Bahamian folk of Joseph Spence with early Dr. John at his most voodooed-out...It's a little surprising that this stuff hasn't undergone a sizable cult revival."

In popular culture
Nina Simone recorded a cover of "Dambala" on her 1974 record, It Is Finished.

"Exuma, the Obeah Man" was featured (playing from vinyl, with the album cover visible) in the 2022 film Nope, with the song being featured on the film's soundtrack.

Track listing

Personnel
Adapted from LP liner notes:
Exuma – lead vocals, guitar, bells, foot drum
Daddy Ya Ya – producer, vocals, bells, foot drum, "sacred sand"
Spy Boy Thielheim – backing vocals, triangle, cabasa, whistle, bells
Lord Wellington – congas
Frankie Gearing – backing vocals
Geraldine McBride – backing vocals
Mildred Vaney – backing vocals
Princess Diana – backing vocals
Sally O'Brien – backing vocals

References

External links

1970 debut albums
Folk albums
Exuma (musician) albums
Mercury Records albums